Svend Arvid Stanislaw Brodersen (born 22 March 1997) is a German professional footballer who plays as a goalkeeper for J2 League club Yokohama FC.

Club career
Brodersen made his professional debut for FC St. Pauli in the 2. Bundesliga on 8 February 2019, starting in the away match against 1. FC Köln, which finished as a 4–1 loss.

Brodersen joined struggling J1 League side Yokohama FC in the summer of 2021, making his debut in a 2–0 home win against Nagoya Grampus.

International career
Brodersen was included in Germany's squad for the 2017 FIFA U-20 World Cup in South Korea. He made two appearances in the group stage, along with the round of 16 match against Zambia, in which Germany were eliminated with a 4–3 loss after extra time.

References

External links
 
 

 FC St. Pauli profile

1997 births
Living people
Footballers from Hamburg
German footballers
Association football goalkeepers
Germany youth international footballers
Germany under-21 international footballers
Olympic footballers of Germany
Footballers at the 2020 Summer Olympics
2. Bundesliga players
Regionalliga players
J1 League players
J2 League players
FC St. Pauli II players
FC St. Pauli players
Yokohama FC players
German expatriate footballers
German expatriate sportspeople in Japan
Expatriate footballers in Japan